Ostrinia kurentzovi is a moth in the family Crambidae. It was described by Akira Mutuura and Eugene G. Munroe in 1970. It is found in the Russian Far East (Ussuri).

References

Moths described in 1970
Pyraustinae